A village otaman was the head of a village community in Ukraine from the 14th until the 20th centuries. Village otamans were elected or chosen by state authorities of some or other level.

Civil War for Democracy, 1917-1923, Ukraine 

During the Civil War on the territories of Russian Empire and especially modern Ukraine, the "village otaman" became a concept, designating commanders of small self-organized military and para-military troops, organized sometimes by people to defend their rights and liberties and sometimes having clearly expressed criminal character ("banda"). The phenomenon of village otamans existed during the Russian Civil War and some time after, until the new state system with its
police began to fully function. Vivid examples of village otamans are Chorny Voron (Chornousov Ivan Yakovych) and Green Otaman (Terpylo Danylo Ilkovych).

Name "greens" in historical science 

Alias Green Otaman used by Terpylo Danylo Ilkovych later gave one of the names to the phenomenon of "village otamans" often used in soviet books about this period of history of region - "greens", in contrast to "reds" and "whites".

References

Social history of Ukraine